Bubble Guppies is a preschool children's television series produced for Nickelodeon and created by Jonny Belt, and Robert Scull. On June 4, 2019, the show was revived for a fifth season, which debuted on September 23, 2019. On February 19, 2020, the show was renewed for a sixth season, which premiered on October 19, 2021.

Series overview

Episodes

Season 1 (2011)

Season 2 (2011–13)

Season 3 (2013–15)

Season 4 (2015–16)

Season 5 (2019–21)

Season 6 (2021–22)

Notes

References

Bubble Guppies
Bubble Guppies
Bubble Guppies